= Watson Hill =

Hill in Massachusetts

Coordinates: 41.9528°N 70.6629°W

Watson Hill is a summit in Plymouth County, Massachusetts. The elevation is 95 feet (29 m).

Watson Hill has the name of Elkanah Watson, a pioneer who owned the site in the 1680s.
